Eskaleh-ye Shahid Rajai (also Romanized as Esḵaleh-ye Shahīd Rajā‘ī) is a village in Gachin Rural District, in the Central District of Bandar Abbas County, Hormozgan Province, Iran. At the 2006 census, its population was 42, in 19 families.

References 

Populated places in Bandar Abbas County